HMS Hawke was a 74-gun third rate ship of the line of the Black Prince class of the Royal Navy, launched on 16 March 1820 at Woolwich Dockyard.

She was converted to a screw-propelled 'blockship', fitted with screw propulsion and re-armed with just 60 guns in 1855, and was broken up in 1865.

Notes

References

Lavery, Brian (2003) The Ship of the Line - Volume 1: The development of the battlefleet 1650-1850. Conway Maritime Press. .
Winfield, Rif (2008) British Warships in the Age of Sail 1793-1817: Design, Construction, Careers and Fates. 2nd edition, Seaforth Publishing, 2008. .

Ships of the line of the Royal Navy
Black Prince-class ships of the line
Ships built in Woolwich
1820 ships